Somatochlora calverti, the Calvert's emerald, is a species of dragonfly in the family Corduliidae. It is endemic to the United States.  Its natural habitats are rivers and swamps.

References 

Insects of the United States
Corduliidae
Taxonomy articles created by Polbot
Insects described in 1933